Koppelvatna is the name of five small lakes at Kongsøya in Kong Karls Land, Svalbard. They are located at the eastern part of the island, between Nordaustpynten, Bremodden and Johnsenberget.

References

Lakes of Svalbard
Kongsøya